Buffalo City is a metropolitan municipality situated on the east coast of Eastern Cape Province, South Africa. It includes the towns of East London, Bhisho and Qonce, as well as the large townships of Mdantsane and Zwelitsha.

History

The municipality was established as a local municipality in 2000 after South Africa's reorganisation of municipal areas, and is named after the Buffalo River, at whose mouth lies the only river port in South Africa. On 18 May 2011, it was separated from the Amathole District Municipality and converted into a metropolitan municipality.

The area has a well-developed manufacturing base, with the auto industry playing a major role. Daimler AG through its wholly owned subsidiary Mercedes-Benz South Africa (MBSA) has a large assembly plant located next to the port of East London, which produces a variety of vehicles for export.

The climate is mild, with year-round sunshine. Average rainfall is 850mm (33.5 inches).

The population of 701,873 (2001) is largely African (85.2%), with White (8.4%) and Coloured (5.7%) minorities. There is also a small Indian community (0.6%).

The previous mayor, Dr Sindisile Maclean (ANC), was elected in 2000. Buffalo City elected its first female mayor on Friday, 17 March 2006. Ntombentle Peter was voted in as Executive Mayor at the inaugural meeting of the new council following the municipal elections.

Main places
The 2011 census divided the municipality into the following main places:

Note:Only the most populated places are reported

Politics 

The municipal council consists of one hundred members elected by mixed-member proportional representation. Fifty councillors are elected by first-past-the-post voting in fifty wards, while the remaining fifty are chosen from party lists so that the total number of party representatives is proportional to the number of votes received. In the election of 1 November 2021 the African National Congress (ANC) won a majority of seats on the council.

The following table shows the results of the election.

Hospitals

The following hospitals are located in the municipal area:
Life Beacon Bay Hospital 
Bhisho Provincial Hospital
Cecilia Makiwane Hospital (Mdantsane)
Duncan Village Day Hospital
East London Private Hospital
Fort Grey TB Hospital
Frere Hospital
Grey Provincial Hospital (Qonce)
Grey Monument Private Clinic (Qonce)
Mount Coke Hospital (replaced by Bhisho Hospital in December 1991)
Nkqubela Chest Hospital (Mdantsane)
St Dominic’s Hospital
St James Hospital
St Marks Clinic

Town twinning

Buffalo City's town twins are:
 Gävle, Sweden
 Leiden, Netherlands
 Milwaukee County, United States of America

References

External links
Buffalo City Official site
Eastern Cape Dept of Health list of hospitals